Caballeronia glathei is a Gram-negative soil bacterium. It is motile by using one polar flagellum. The bacterium is a pathogen for Asian rice (Oryza sativa).

References

Burkholderiaceae
Bacteria described in 1975